The 1989–90 Washington Huskies men's basketball team represented the University of Washington for the 1989–90 NCAA Division I men's basketball season. Led by first-year head coach Lynn Nance, the Huskies were members of the Pacific-10 Conference and played their home games on campus at Hec Edmundson Pavilion in Seattle, Washington.

In the Pac-10 tournament in Tempe, Arizona, Washington met host and eighth seed Arizona State in the first round and lost by six points.

Alumnus Nance was hired in April 1989, he was previously the head coach at

Postseason results

|-
!colspan=5 style=| Pacific-10 Tournament

References

External links
Sports Reference – Washington Huskies: 1988–89 basketball season

Washington Huskies men's basketball seasons
Washington Huskies
Washington
Washington